John Bright Garrison (February 13, 1909 – May 13, 1988) was an American ice hockey player.

He was born in West Newton, Massachusetts and died in Lincoln, Massachusetts. Garrison grew up playing on the varsity team of the County Day School in West Newton, Massachusetts before entering Harvard University. He received many offers from professional clubs after graduation from Harvard but chose a career in business instead while continuing to play amateur hockey.

In 1932 he was a member of the American ice hockey team, which won the silver medal. He played all six matches and scored three goals.

Four years later he won the bronze medal with the American team in the 1936 Olympics. He played seven matches and scored four goals.

He was also a member of the Massachusetts Rangers, the American team that won the 1933 World Ice Hockey Championships. Garrison scored the dramatic overtime goal in a 2-1 victory over the Canadian national team, thus ensuring the gold medal.

He was inducted into the United States Hockey Hall of Fame in 1973.

External links
 
 United States Hockey Hall of Fame bio

1909 births
1988 deaths
American men's ice hockey defensemen
Harvard Crimson men's ice hockey players
Ice hockey players from Massachusetts
Ice hockey players at the 1932 Winter Olympics
Ice hockey players at the 1936 Winter Olympics
Medalists at the 1932 Winter Olympics
Medalists at the 1936 Winter Olympics
Olympic silver medalists for the United States in ice hockey
Olympic bronze medalists for the United States in ice hockey
Place of death missing
United States Hockey Hall of Fame inductees